This is a list of notable LGBT people from the city of London.

Activists 
 Peter Tatchell

Aviation and military
 James Wharton (author)
 Ethel Mary Smyth

Arts and entertainment

Actors 
 Stephen Fry
 Ian McKellen
 Sir John Gielgud
 Kenneth Williams
 Saffron Dominique Burrows
 Amanda Donohoe
 Sophie Ward
 Jill Esmond

Artists 
 Duncan Grant

Comedians 
 Alan Carr

Culinary arts 
 Yotam Ottolenghi
 Peter Gordon

Dance 
 Frederick Ashton
 Matthew Bourne
 Frederic Franklin
 Wayne Sleep

Drag kings and queens

DJs 
 Samantha Ronson

Film 
 Derek Jarman
 Anthony William Lars Asquith
 John Schlesinger
 Isaac Julien

Internet personalities

Music 
 Boy George
 Freddie Mercury (1946-1991)
 George Michael (1963-2016)
 Marc Almond
 Mika
 Pete Burns
 Rylan Clark-Neal
 Samantha Fox
 Thomas Adès
 Will Young
 Stephen Hough

Photography

Reality television

Television 
 Paul O'Grady
 Graham Norton
 Dale Winton

Theatre
 Oscar Wilde (1854-1900)

Visual arts

Business 
 John Maynard Keynes (1883–1946)
 Caroline Cossey

Education

Felons

Philanthropy and nonprofits

Politics and law

Religion

Science, mathematics and technology 
 Alan Turing
 Colin Turnbull
 James Joseph Sylvester

Sports 
 Tom Daley

Writers 
 Edward Morgan Forster
 Oscar Wilde
 Siegfried Sassoon
 Lytton Strachey
 Radclyffe Hall
 Virginia Woolf (1882-1941)
 Joe Randolph "J. R." Ackerley
 Peter Ackroyd
 Daniel Tammet
 Colin MacInnes
 Daphne du Maurier

See also

References

Lists of LGBT-related people
London-related lists
LGBT in London
Lists of people from London